Selaginella uliginosa is a small perennial plant found in Australia. An ancient and primitive plant, usually under 10 centimetres tall, it is often seen in sunny moist areas. The specific epithet uliginosa is from Latin, referring to the plant's preference for growing in swampy locations.

References

uliginosa
Flora of New South Wales
Flora of Western Australia
Flora of Queensland
Flora of Victoria (Australia)
Flora of Tasmania
Flora of the Northern Territory
Flora of Lord Howe Island